Autophila anaphanes is a moth of the family Erebidae first described by Charles Boursin in 1940. It is found in the eastern part of the Mediterranean, including the Balkans, Cyprus, Turkey, Lebanon and Israel.

There is one generation per year. Adults are on wing from April to June.

The larvae feed on Genista and Ulex species.

Subspecies
Autophila anaphanes anaphanes
Autophila anaphanes cypriaca
Autophila anaphanes cretica (Crete)

External links

Lepiforum e.V.

Toxocampina
Moths of Europe
Moths of the Middle East
Moths described in 1940